Ethyl thiocyanate is a chemical compound used as an agricultural insecticide.

References

 Ethylthiocyanate at www.chemicalbook.com.

Thiocyanates